StarWipe was a satirical website from The Onion which parodied celebrity gossip sites, such as TMZ. It launched on September 21, 2015, and closed on June 17, 2016.  It was run by Sean O'Neal, the senior editor of The A.V. Club.

Content posted on StarWipe was also shared on social media platforms such as Facebook and Twitter.

See also
 List of satirical news websites

References

External links
 

The Onion
Fusion Media Group
Internet properties established in 2015
2015 establishments in Illinois
Internet properties disestablished in 2016
2016 disestablishments in Illinois